Farma is a Slovak reality television show, first broadcast in July 2011. Contestants are called Farmers in the show, and they compete against each other to become the win 50 000 € . The series first aired in 2011. There have been five seasons, which have been filmed on five different farm. A total of 97 participants have competed.

Quitters
Nikola Komorová - Season 2 - After 28 days quit.
Nikola Čajkovská - Season 3 - After 7 days quit.
Lýdia Spišáková - Season 3 - After 9 days quit.
Ivana Slabá - Season 9 - After 7 days quit.
Ján Solárik - Season 9 - After 11 days quit.
Frederika Lukyová - Season 9 - After 28 days quit.

Removed due to Injury
Ľubomír Filkor - Season 2 - After 12 days.
Gabriel Sajka -  Season 3 - After 9 days.
Lucia Mokráňová -  Season 5 - After 38 days.
Ján Beutel -  Season 5 - After 38 days.
Michal Pavlík -  Season 6 - After 87 days.
Jana Hrmová -  Season 7 - After 37 days.
Lenka Hrčková -  Season 7 - After 56 days.
Ladislav Krajčovič - Season 9 - After 4 days.
Tomáš "Tomy Kotty" Drahoš - Season 9 - After 48 days.

Contestants
All information is accurate as of the time the season was filmed, and thus may vary from season to season for returning players.

The Farm (franchise)
Farma (Slovak TV series) contestants